The Coral Princess is a 1937 German-Yugoslav comedy film directed by Victor Janson and starring Iván Petrovich, Hilde Sessak and Ita Rina.

The film's sets were designed by the art directors Robert A. Dietrich and Artur Günther. Location shooting took place on the Adriatic coast of Croatia.

Cast
 Iván Petrovich as Marko Vukowitsch, Fliegeroffizier
 Hilde Sessak as Didi Orsich
 Ita Rina as Anka, Vukowitsch' Pflegetochter
 Wilhelm König as Mate / ein Fischer / Ankas Velobter
 Herta Worell as Thea, Nikos Schwester
 Carl-Heinz Schroth as Niko, Inhaber einer Schmuckfabrik
 Olga Limburg as Kapitän Orsichs Frau
 Walter Steinbeck as Kapitän Orsich, Didis Onkel
 Eduard von Winterstein as Vukowitsch, Markos Vater
 Heinz Piper as Leutnant Küken
 Heinrich Schroth as Dr. Milich, der Dorfarzt
 Peter Busse as Ein Korallenfischer
 Hellmuth Passarge as Ein Korallenfischer
 Georg H. Schnell as Ein Fliegerkommandant
 Günther Ballier as Ein Buchhalter in Nikos Fabrik
 Hans Ballmann as Tenor
 Charly Berger as Ein Konferenzteilnehmer
 Hildegard Busse as Die Zofe
 Curt Cappi as Der Diener bei Orsich
 Alfred Karen as Ein Konferenzteilnehmer
 Edith Meinel as Ein Gast bei Didis Geburtstagsfeier
 Hermann Pfeiffer as Ein Buchhalter in Nikos Fabrik
 Kurt Wieschala as Kamerad Markos, Fliegeroffizier

References

Bibliography

External links 
 

1937 comedy films
German comedy films
1937 films
Films of Nazi Germany
1930s German-language films
Films directed by Victor Janson
Tobis Film films
Films shot in Croatia
German black-and-white films
Yugoslav black-and-white films
Yugoslav comedy films
1930s German films